KTVS-LD, virtual channel 36 (UHF digital channel 23), is a low-powered TheGrio TV-affiliated television station licensed to Albuquerque, New Mexico, United States. Founded on October 31, 1986, the station is owned by Alpha Omega Broadcasting.

History
This station began broadcasting in 1988 as K59DB (often identified as KDB) on channel 59. It was the first Telemundo affiliate in the area. By 1997, KTEL-LP had picked up the Telemundo affiliation. KDB had continued as a Spanish-language independent airing mostly music videos and sports programming. By 1999, Continental Broadcasting had sold KDB along with one FM and two AM radio stations to Clear Channel Communications. The format continued until late 2000 when Clear Channel had shut down KDB. The station was later picked up by Alpha-Omega Broadcasting. In 2002, K59DB went back on the air simulcasting programming from KAZQ (channel 32) and in 2003 it would move to channel 36 as KTVS-LP. By October it would begin airing programming separate from KAZQ. Originally the format featured classic TV shows, movies and religious programs from Faith TV. Regional sports programming had also once aired on KTVS.

The FCC spectrum auction which concluded on April 13, 2017 removes part of the UHF spectrum from channels 38-51 for television broadcast. MyNetworkTV affiliate  KASY-TV (channel 50) will be assigned the channel 36 position moving over from channel 45 as part of a spectrum repacking. This will displace KTVS-LD which will have to move to a different channel number to continue broadcasting.

In early October 2017, KTVS-LD affiliated with Light TV replacing a relay of programming from KAZQ.

Digital television

Digital channels
The station's digital signal is multiplexed:

KTVS was viewed on KAZQ-DT3 for a while.

Analog-to-digital conversion

KTVS had "flash cut" to digital on channel 36 in August 2009.

References

External links
KAZQ/KTVS official webpage

TheGrio affiliates
TVS-LD
Television channels and stations established in 1986
Mass media in Albuquerque, New Mexico
Low-power television stations in the United States